Samuel Nicholls (1870–1912) was an English footballer who played in the Football League for West Bromwich Albion where he won the 1892 FA Cup Final, scoring in a 3–0 win against Aston Villa.

Honours
West Bromwich Albion
FA Cup: 1891–92

References

1870 births
1912 deaths
English footballers
Association football forwards
English Football League players
West Bromwich Albion F.C. players
FA Cup Final players